The Miracle Wood Stakes is an American Thoroughbred horse race held in February at Laurel Park Racecourse in Laurel, Maryland. The Miracle Wood is open to three-year-olds and is run at seven furlongs on the dirt.

An ungraded stakes, it currently offers a purse of $100,000. The Miracle Wood is also one of Maryland's triple crown prep races. The winner of the race typically moves on to compete in the Private Terms Stakes held in March at Laurel Park Racecourse as well, but winners have also ventured to New York and Kentucky for their next races.

The race was named in honor of Miracle Wood, a champion Maryland bred colt that won many races and accolades. In 2008,the race was shortened from one mile to the current distance of seven furlongs. During the first eleven years of the race (1993–2003), it was run at a distance of  miles (8.5 furlongs).

In 2006, Sweetnorthernsaint set a record winning margin of ten lengths. He went on to win the Illinois Derby that year and was the post time favorite in the 132nd Kentucky Derby. A local horse based at Laurel Park Racecourse, Sweetnorthernsaint became a millionaire and placed second in the state's biggest race, the Preakness Stakes.

Records 

Speed record: 
 7 furlongs – 1:23.22 – The Lumber Guy (2012)
 1 mile – 1:36.75 –   Extrasexyhippzster  (2014)
  miles – 1:43.00 – Gimmeawink (2003)

Most wins by an owner:
 no owner has the Miracle Wood Stakes more than once

Most wins by a jockey:
 4 – Mario Pino    (1997, 2002, 2006 & 2007)
 3 – Julian Pimentel  (2008, 2012 & 2014)

Most wins by a trainer:
 3 – Michael Trombetta    (2006, 2007 & 2014)

Winners of the Miracle Wood Stakes since 1995

See also 
 Miracle Wood Stakes "top three finishers"
 Pimlico Race Course

References

External links
 Laurel Park website

1995 establishments in Maryland
Triple Crown Prep Races
Laurel Park Racecourse
Horse races in Maryland
Recurring sporting events established in 1995